Salas (also known as San Martin de Salas)  is a town and concejo (municipality) in the Principality of Asturias. It lies on the road from San Sebastián to Santiago de Compostela, and on a small subtributary of the river Narcea. It is bordered on the north by Valdés, Cudillero and Pravia, to south by Belmonte de Miranda, to the east by Pravia, Candamo and Grado, and to the west by Tineo and Valdés.

Salas is a mountainous region in which coal-mining and agriculture are the principal industries. The products of this region are sent for export to Cudillero, a small harbour on the Bay of Biscay. Salas is well known as a tourist point and as the birthplace of Fernando de Valdés y Salas.

Culture

There are several buildings of importance in Salas, the Palacio de Doriga, Palacio de Valdés and Castillo de Salas, among others.
Also the romanesque Monasterio de San Salvador, the Monasterio de San Martin and the Colegiata de Santa María la Mayor.

Parishes

Alava
Ardesaldo
Bodenaya
Camuño
Cermoño
Cornellana
Godán
Idarga
La Espina
Laneo
Lavio
Linares
Mallecina
Malleza
Millara
Priero
Salas
San Antolín de la Dóriga
San Esteban de la Dóriga
San Justo de la Dóriga
San Vicente
Santa Eulalia de la Dóriga
Santiago de la Barca
Santullano
Soto de los Infantes
Viescas
Villamar
Villazón

Politics

References 

Municipalities in Asturias